Irish penny coin may refer to:

Penny (Irish pre-decimal coin)
Penny (Irish decimal coin)